Treween is a hamlet in the parish of Altarnun, Cornwall, England, United Kingdom.

References

Hamlets in Cornwall